Amanda is a feminine given name

Amanda or AMANDA may also refer to:

Places
Amanda Bay, Princess Elizabeth Land, Antarctica
Amanda Township, Allen County, Ohio
Amanda Township, Fairfield County, Ohio
Amanda, Ohio, a village in the township
Amanda Township, Hancock County, Ohio
725 Amanda, an asteroid

Fiction
Amanda (novel), a 1984 novel by Candice F. Ransom
Amanda (TV program), a 1940s American variety television series
Amanda (Chilean TV series), a 2016 telenovela
Amanda's, a short-lived 1983 situation comedy TV show based on Fawlty Towers
The Amanda Show, a comedy/variety television program
Amanda (2009 film), a 2009 film by Steve Marra
Amanda (2022 film), a 2022 film by Carolina Cavalli

Music
Amanda (singer), Swedish pop singer
"Amanda" (Boston song), a 1986 song by Boston
"Amanda" (Don Williams song), a 1979 hit for Waylon Jennings and also popularized by Don Williams
"Amanda" (Craig McLachlan song), a 1990 song by Craig McLachlan and Check 1-2
"Amanda" (Jimmy Jansson song), from Melodifestivalen 2007
"Amanda", a 1971 song by Steve Peregrin Took, recorded by his band Shagrat and released as a posthumous single in 1990
 Amanda (album), a 1985 album by Brazilian jazz artist Eliane Elias and trumpeter Randy Brecker

AMANDA
Antarctic Muon And Neutrino Detector Array
Advanced Maryland Automatic Network Disk Archiver, Unix-based backup utility

Other uses
Amanda (award), Norwegian film award
 Amanda (gastropod), a member of the nudibranch family 
Amanda (orchid), subgenus of Masdevallia orchids
Cyclone Amanda
Operation Amanda, a 1994 United Nations Protection Force mission in Bosnia and Herzegovina
USS Amanda, a bark in the Union Navy during the American Civil War

See also

 
 
 
 Manda (disambiguation)
 Mandy (disambiguation)